is a fictional character from SNK's Art of Fighting series of fighting games. She first appears in the original Art of Fighting being kidnapped by Mr. Big, a criminal from the city of South Town. The players, Yuri's brother Ryo and his friend Robert Garcia spend the game searching for her. In the sequel, Yuri appears for the first time as a playable character, having been trained by her father Takuma in the art of the Kyokugen Karate. Yuri has also starred in the anime adaptation from Art of Fighting, in which she reprises her role from the first game.

She has appeared in most games from The King of Fighters series, with the notable exception of  The King of Fighters XII, participating in the annual tournaments from each title. She initially starts in the Women Fighters Team (composed entirely of women), but she later moves to the Art of Fighting Team along with her family. She was also featured in the SNK vs. Capcom crossover series as well as in SNK Gals' Fighters. Critical reception Yuri has been mostly positive for her transition from damsel in distress to a fighter in the Art of Fighting series. Her inclusion in The King of Fighters series was noted to give her more variety in her movesets which would appeal to gamers.

Creation and design
Yuri was created to be a woman spoiled by her older brother Ryo Sakazaki. Although she was given a tragic past due to her mother's death and her father's disappearance, SNK gave her an upbeat character. For the character voices, they used all pro or semi-pro voice actors. Yuri and King were done by the same person. Once it was announced Yuri would be a playable character in Art of Fighting 2, the staff behind The King of Fighters '94 wanted her to be as part of the cast. She replaced the character Big Bear from King's team due to memory issues. Afterwards, the team added Mai Shiranui to the team and form the Women's Team. Yuri's designer said the character had some bosom animation but not as much as Mai; she spent much work on Yuri's calves. Additionally, the Art of Fighting staff wanted Yuri to appear in the game, thus, she was added to the Women Fighters Team as the leader.

In making Yuri for The King of Fighters XIII, director Kei Yamamoto stated Yuri wanted the character's moves to focus on kicks. Due to the skill required to perform some of her special attacks, Yamamoto feels Yuri's players to train themselves in order to use her properly. There was originally an attempt to give the character one of Robert Garcia's moves because of both of them handling their lower limbs, but was removed due to not fitting Yuri. Yuri's redesign gave the staff a good impression in how she her sprites changed, especially liking the universal lower body due to her combination of white gi and blue pants.

KOF: Maximum Impact marks the first time since Art of Fighting 2 that she has received a new outfit. Such outfit is composed of a green camo print shirt, short pants, dark green gloves and green shoes. In KOF: Maximum Impact 2, some of her extra normal outfits make her look like fellow Kyokugen practitioners; color scheme B makes her look like Ryo (blond hair, orange gi and black tights), while scheme F resembles Robert Garcia's outfit from The King of Fighters '99 to 2002, which consists of brown hair, orange gi with black long-sleeved tights, and no headband.

Appearances

Video games
Although Yuri is not playable in the first Art of Fighting game, she plays a big role in the plot as she is kidnapped by the Southtown criminal Mr. Big, causing Ryo Sakazaki and Robert Garcia to search for her throughout the game. In the end, Ryo and Robert fight Mr. Karate, a soldier from Mr. Big taking Yuri as a hostage, but they are stopped by Yuri who reveals that he is Takuma. In Art of Fighting 2, Yuri becomes a playable character, being trained by Takuma after the events from the previous game. Yuri enters into the King of Fighters tournament along with Ryo, Robert and Takuma in order to defeat Geese Howard, the criminal who turned Takuma into Mr. Karate, wanting him to kill people. Yuri uses the lowest-grade Kyokugenryu movelist in the discipline, called the Raiou principle, which taught only the basic and low-level moves and encouraged personal instinct to be used in conjunction with the tutelage. Among Yuri's personally-crafted moves are the Slipstream Handslap and the Big Butt Press. Because of Yuri's ability to craft techniques based on basic Kyokugen principle, Takuma is slowly acknowledging her as a true Kyokugen disciple. In Art of Fighting 3, Yuri is once again unplayable, but she appears along with Ryo searching for Robert, who was helping a childhood friend known as Freya Lawrence. Yuri starts also to be attracted to Robert, something noted by Ryo to the point of telling her to accompany of a journey in the ending.

Yuri is also a playable character in The King of Fighters series first as part of the Women Fighters Team along with Mai Shiranui and King participating in the annual King of Fighters tournaments. In The King of Fighters '96, Yuri is requested by Takuma to participate in the Art of Fighting Team along with Ryo and Robert as Takuma decided to retire from the team. The King of Fighters '98 too features Yuri playable with her Art of Fighting 2 moveset as a hidden character. Due to the new rule that teams must be composed of four members, Takuma returns to the Art of Fighting Team in The King of Fighters '99. In The King of Fighters 2000, Yuri returns to the Women Fighters Team along with Mai, Hinako Shijou and Kasumi Todoh, having asked King to replace her in the Art of Fighting Team wanting more independence. Yuri once again returns to the Art of Fighting Team in The King of Fighters 2001 wanting to win the prize money to help Robert with several economical problems his company has. Although The King of Fighters 2002 does not feature a storyline, Yuri is once again in the Women Fighters Team with Mai and May Lee, but was moved back to the Art of Fighting Team in the remake, The King of Fighters 2002: Unlimited Match. In The King of Fighters 2003 and XI, Yuri continues in the Art of Fighting Team, but only with Ryo and Robert as the tournament once again requires only 3 fighters per team. Yuri's next official King of Fighters appearance was in The King of Fighters XIII, where she joins her fellow team members from The King of Fighters '94. However, by The King of Fighters XIV, Takuma fell ill as he had to not only manage the dojo but also his restaurant named "Kyokugen BBQ", thus prompting Yuri to not only leaving her '94 team members for her '96 team members Ryo and Robert, also to surpass her family.

Yuri appears in the spin-off game The King of Fighters Neowave with the original Women Fighters Team. In The King of Fighters: Kyo the lead character Kyo Kusanagi finds Yuri telling Takuma and Ryo that she wants to return to the Women Fighters Team. After a long discussion, Kyo proposes a fight with them to decide if Yuri can leave. Yuri later appears helping Kyo to find his kidnapped girlfriend Yuki along with Ryo and Robert. She appears as an assistant character (named "Striker") in The King of Fighters EX for the Art of Fighting Team, and as a playable character along with Ryo and Takuma in The King of Fighters EX2. She is also featured in the 3D games KOF: Maximum Impact and Maximum Impact 2 participating in new tournaments from Southtown. The spin-offs King of Fighters R-1 and King of Fighters R-2 feature Yuri as part of the Super Babe Team alongside Athena Asamiya and Kasumi Todoh.

Additionally, she stars in most games from the SNK vs. Capcom series except SNK vs. Capcom: SVC Chaos (where she makes a cameo appearance in Ryo's and Mr. Karate's endings). In the crossover SNK Gals' Fighters Yuri appears as a playable character with her wanting to start her own gym, while she also appears in SNK Heroines: Tag Team Frenzy. She is furthermore present in the cellphone games such as KOF Gals Mahjong, The King of Fighters '98: Ulimited Match Online, The King of Fighters All Star and Kimi wa Hero. Her character design serves as downloadable content in Dead or Alive 5 Last Round, as well as Lucent Heart. In Super Smash Bros. Ultimate, she has a cameo appearance as a background character on the King of Fighters Stadium stage.

Other appearances
Yuri appears in various SNK manga and in the Art of Fighting anime adaptation which retells the story from the first game but with Mr. Big wanting to obtain a diamond that Ryo and Robert found. She is voiced by Ayumi Hamasaki (before her rise to stardom as a pop singer) in the Japanese version and by Veronica Taylor in the English dub. An action figure of her character was released by SNK Playmore. Many statuette figures have been released by various manufacturers.

Reception and cultural impact
Yuri has been well received by Japanese gamers, having been voted as the 19th favorite character in the 1997 character popularity poll on Neo Geo Freak'''s website. In 1995, Japanese magazine Gamest ranked her as number seven in the list of the top characters of 1994. In 2018, Yuri was voted as the tenth most popular Neo Geo character.

Yuri's character has received mixed responses from English-language video games publication based on her role in Art of Fighting. Eurogamer noted that Yuri's kidnap in the first game was "a mostly unfathomable quest", senseless since she is later taken as hostage by her own father. GamingExellence liked Yuri's introduction in Art of Fighting 2 as a playable character as it gave more variety to the character roster. However, he complained about her being removed in Art of Fighting 3 "with less than stellar replacements" Similarly, IGN enjoyed Yuri's charactization in the sequel due to how it contrast her previous role of a damsel in distress. with Thunderbolt sharing similar opinions due to the variety of new characters in the sequel. HonestGamers found hilarious Yuri's interactions with Ryo in the second Art of Fighting game but lamented how she was unplayable in the third and how she only made cameos to assist Robert. Complex saw her as derivative archetype based on Ryu from Street Fighter though the site found her brother closer to the design.

Journalists also explored Yuri's role in The King of Fighters franchise. The Armchair Empire liked her cosplay by Fio from the Metal Slug series in KOF: Maximum Impact as it contrasted other new outfits which he considered embarrassing. Den of Geek listed her as the 67th best The King of Fighters character for her upbeat personality as well as the impact she made in Art of Fighting 2 when she became a playable character. Originally absent from KOF XII, Eurogamer appreciated Yuri's return to The King of Fighters XIII as she once again forms the Women Fighters Team. PC Mag criticized how in KOF XIII both Yuri's and King's outfits can be destroyed if they are defeated through special moves due to the humiliation this gives them. Niche Gamer stated that while the Art of Fighting team from The King of Fighters XIV perform similar moves, they still provide varierty, referring to Yuri's as "both cute and utterly unpredictable". Den of Geek noted that the trio and the team in general has been characterized as more comical characters in The King of Fighters than in Art of Fighting though in XI they accidentally created their own rival.

While the character of Dan Hibiki from the Street Fighter series is deemed as a parody of Ryo due to his similarities with Ryu and Ken from such series, he often shows mannerisms similar to Yuri's.Top 25 Street Fighter Characters - Day III . IGN. Retrieved on August 15, 2008 Manga artist Nobuhiro Watsuki designed the character of Makimachi Misao for the Rurouni Kenshin manga series, but some fans complained that the character was very similar to Nakoruru from the Samurai Shodown'' video games series. Watsuki responded saying that the character was more similar to Mai Shiranui or Yuri, comically saying he was "making his own grave" due to the similarities with the SNK characters.

References

External links
 

Art of Fighting characters
Female characters in anime and manga
Female characters in video games
Fictional female martial artists
Fictional Japanese people in video games
Fictional karateka
Fictional martial artists in video games
SNK protagonists
The King of Fighters characters
Woman soldier and warrior characters in video games
Video game characters introduced in 1992